Synaphea damopsis is a shrub endemic to Western Australia.

The decumbent shrub usually blooms between September and November producing yellow flowers.

It is found in the southern Wheatbelt and South West regions of Western Australia where it grows in gravelly soils over laterite.

References

Eudicots of Western Australia
damopsis
Endemic flora of Western Australia
Plants described in 1995